Nicolai Cebotari (born 24 May 1997) is a Moldovan footballer who plays as a goalkeeper for Petrocub Hîncești.

Honours 
FC Sheriff Tiraspol

 Divizia Națională: 2018

References

External links
Player Profile at foradejogo.net

Profile at UEFA

1997 births
Living people
Moldovan footballers
Moldova youth international footballers
Moldova under-21 international footballers
Association football goalkeepers
Moldovan Super Liga players
FC Academia Chișinău players
FC Sfîntul Gheorghe players
FC Sheriff Tiraspol players
CS Petrocub Hîncești players
U.D. Leiria players
FC Botev Vratsa players
Liga II players
FC Petrolul Ploiești players
Moldovan expatriate footballers
Moldovan expatriate sportspeople in Portugal
Expatriate footballers in Portugal
Moldovan expatriate sportspeople in Bulgaria
Expatriate footballers in Bulgaria
Moldovan expatriate sportspeople in Romania
Expatriate footballers in Romania